KSEV (700 AM) is a commercial radio station, licensed to Tomball, Texas, and serving Greater Houston. It broadcasts a talk radio format and is owned by Texas Lieutenant Governor Dan Patrick.  (Patrick is not related to sports radio and TV host Dan Patrick.)  The studios and offices are on Katy Freeway (I-10) in Houston.  The transmitter is off FM 2978 in Magnolia, Texas.

AM 700 is a clear-channel frequency reserved for WLW in Cincinnati, a Class A, 50,000-watt station.  While KSEV operates with 15,000 watts by day, it must reduce power at night to 1,000 watts to avoid interference.  There are only eleven other stations in the United States that broadcast on 700 kHz.

Programming
On weekdays, KSEV features local hosts in the morning and afternoon drive times, with paid brokered programming in middays and syndicated conservative talk shows heard the rest of the day.  Hosts include Brian Kilmeade, Ben Shapiro, Dana Loesch, Joe Pags and Dan Bongino; programs include Red Eye Radio and First Light.  On weekends, KSEV carries programs about money, health, lifestyle, real estate, cars, and gardening; while money, lifestyle, and health programs were also carried on weekday afternoons, some of which are brokered programming. Most hours begin with the world and national news from Townhall Radio.

The station's primary competitors are two well-established talk stations, both owned by iHeartMedia, AM 740 KTRH and AM 950 KPRC, as well as Salem Media talk radio outlet AM 1070 KNTH.

History
On December 1, 1986, the station first signed on as KTBT.  It was owned by Duncan Broadcasting and aired a middle of the road (MOR) music format.  At first, the power was 2,500 watts by day and 1,000 watts at night. 
 
Howard Sellers acquired the station in September 1989.  He kept the format as MOR.  Sellers sold the station the following month.
 
In October 1989, the station changed owners again, as Sunbelt Broadcasting bought the station for only $47,164.  Sunbelt's president and owner was Dan Patrick, who was already hosting a show on KTBT. Previously, Patrick had served as sports director for KHOU Channel 11 in Houston. Sunbelt changed the call sign to KSEV and switched the format to conservative talk.  The station became an NBC Radio Network affiliate and also got a boost in power to 25,000 watts in the daytime, and 1,000 watts at night. Patrick wore several hats as owner, general manager, and morning drive sports talk host in the early years of KSEV. Also in 1989, KSEV acquired the Houston-area rights to run the nationally syndicated Rush Limbaugh Show, while Limbaugh was relatively unknown. (Limbaugh later switched to 740 KTRH, owned by iHeartMedia, which also syndicates Limbaugh's show.) In April of that year, Los Angeles Kings hockey games were aired; it ended in June 1993. Dallas Stars took over in the fall of that year. By 1990, along with Limbaugh and Patrick, KSEV had a lineup of local hosts which included Roger Gray, Jerry Trupiano, and former Houston Chronicle sportswriter Ed Fowler. Bob Hallmark was the program director and Rod Evans served as the news director.   
 
In 1995, KSEV was acquired by San Antonio-based Clear Channel Communications.  The format remained talk and Patrick stayed on as vice president and general manager.   
 
The station changed hands again in 2001, as Clear Channel sold KSEV to Liberman Broadcasting, based in Southern California.  Even though Lieberman usually programs Spanish-language formats, KSEV remained a conservative talk station in English.  Patrick remained KSEV's vice president, running the station through a local marketing agreement (LMA). Patrick later bought the station from Lieberman.

References

External links

KSEV Radio's website is http://www.ksevradio.com

SEV
News and talk radio stations in the United States
Radio stations established in 1962